Mount Scott is a  mountain summit located within Olympic National Park in Jefferson County of Washington state.

Description

Mount Scott is part of the Bailey Range, which is a subrange of the Olympic Mountains, and is set within the Daniel J. Evans Wilderness. The nearest higher neighbor is line parent Mount Ferry,  to the west, Ludden Peak is set one mile to the north, and Mount Pulitzer rises two miles to the west-southwest. Precipitation runoff from the mountain drains into tributaries of the Goldie River, which in turn is a tributary of the Elwha River. Topographic relief is significant as the summit rises 4,300 feet (1,310 m) above the Elwha Valley in approximately two miles.

Climate

Based on the Köppen climate classification, Mount Scott is located in the marine west coast climate zone of western North America. Most weather fronts originate in the Pacific Ocean, and travel east toward the Olympic Mountains. As fronts approach, they are forced upward by the peaks of the Olympic Range, causing them to drop their moisture in the form of rain or snowfall (Orographic lift). As a result, the Olympics experience high precipitation, especially during the winter months. During winter months, weather is usually cloudy, but due to high pressure systems over the Pacific Ocean that intensify during summer months, there is often little or no cloud cover during the summer.

Geology

The Olympic Mountains are composed of obducted clastic wedge material and oceanic crust, primarily Eocene sandstone, turbidite, and basaltic oceanic crust. The mountains were sculpted during the Pleistocene era by erosion and glaciers advancing and retreating multiple times.

Etymology

This peak was named by the 1889–90 Seattle Press Expedition for James Wilmot Scott (1849–1895), editor and publisher of the Chicago Herald, a newspaper he started in 1881.

This geographical feature's name has been officially adopted by the U.S. Board on Geographic Names.

See also

 Geology of the Pacific Northwest

References

External links
 James Wilmot Scott
 James Wilmot Scott biography
 

Olympic Mountains
Mountains of Washington (state)
Landforms of Olympic National Park
North American 1000 m summits
Mountains of Jefferson County, Washington